USS Nitro may refer to the following ships of the United States Navy:

 , a Pyro-class ammunition ship launched in 1919 and sold for scrap in 1949
 , lead ship of the Nitro class of ammunition ship; launched in 1958 and struck in 1995

United States Navy ship names